Live at the Café de Paris is a live album by Marlene Dietrich, recorded in London, at her opening night in Café de Paris on June 21, 1954. Orchestra conducted by George Smith. Dietrich is introduced by Noël Coward.Issued on LP by Columbia Records (catalogue number ML4975) and Philips (BO7684R), as well as Columbia EP A-1115 (three 7-inch 45 rpm records in a heavy cardboard gatefold cover with extensive liner notes).  Neither Columbia pressing includes "Go 'Way from My Window". The original Philips issue excludes "Lazy Afternoon" and "No Love, No Nothin'". Issued on CD as The Marlene Dietrich Album on Sony MDK47254. The 'live' version of "No Love, No Nothin'" in both LP and CD, is actually a studio recording with added applause, probably used to fill out the running time of the original 12" US LP. The original studio recording without applause is on the osmopolitan Marlene Dietrich (Sony Music 1993) CD. The CD reissue by Sony does not include "Go 'Way from My Window" or "Das Lied ist aus".

Track listing

See also
 Marlene Dietrich discography

References

1954 live albums
Marlene Dietrich albums
Columbia Records live albums
Live traditional pop albums